Hamida Ahmad bey qizi Javanshir (19 January 1873 – 6 February 1955) – One of the first enlightened women of Azerbaijan, wife of Jalil Mammadguluzadeh, daughter of historian Ahmad Bey Javanshir, philanthropist, translator, member of Azerbaijan Writers' Union.

Early life 
Born on her family's ancestral estate in the village of Kahrizli, Hamida Javanshir was the eldest child of Ahmad bey Javanshir (1828–1903), an Azeri historian, translator and officer of the Russian Imperial army, and his wife Mulkijahan. She was the great-great-grandniece of Ibrahim Khalil Khan, the last ruling khan of Karabakh. Hamida and her younger brother were educated at home; when she was nine, a family of Russian tutors came to live with them to guide their education. By age 14, she was familiar with European and Islamic literature, and spoke Russian and French fluently.

In 1889 Hamida Javanshir married a Barda-native, Lieutenant Colonel Ibrahim bey Davatdarov. They settled in Brest-Litovsk (in present-day Belarus). Soon their two children, Mina and Muzaffar, were born.  Javanshir took ballroom dance lessons and studied German and Polish. In 1900 the family moved to Kars, where Davatdarov was appointed commander of a military fortress. A year later he died, leaving his 28-year-old wife a widow; her wish to study medicine in Moscow seemed unrealizable.

Later life and activism 
She inherited the Kahrizli estate from her father and continued his successful cotton business. In accordance with his will, she took the manuscript of his historical work On the Political Affairs of the Karabakh khanate in 1747–1805 to Tiflis (capital of present-day Georgia) in order to get it printed at the Geyrat publishing house. Here, in October 1905, she met Jalil Mammadguluzadeh, who then was a columnist for the Azeri-language newspaper Sharg-i rus. In 1907 they married (Mammadguluzadeh was twice-widowed at the time) and lived in Tiflis until 1920. They had two sons, Midhat in 1908 and Anvar in 1911. She worked with Mammadguluzadeh to publish Molla Nasraddin, a satirical magazine.

During the Karabakh famine of 1907 Hamida Javanshir distributed flour and millet to starving villagers, and also acted as a mediator between local Armenians and Azeris after two years of mutual massacres. In 1908 she founded a coeducational school in her home village of Kahrizli, which became the first Azeri school where boys and girls could study in the same classroom. In 1910 Javanshir, together with female members of the city's Azeri nobility, founded the Muslim Women's Caucasian Benevolent Society. During a smallpox epidemic in the Soviet era, she bought vaccines and gave shots to the people of Kahrizli.

In 1921, after having lived in Tabriz for a year, the family moved to Baku, where she wrote memoirs and translated her husband's works. She published a memoir in the 1930s, Awake: A Moslem Woman’s Rare Memoir of Her Life and Partnership with the Editor of Molla Nasreddin, the Most Influential Satirical Journal of the Caucasus and Iran, 1907–1931, published posthumously in 1967, and translated into English by Hasan Javadi and Willem Floor. She also translated Russian poetry. She outlived two of her children: Mina in 1923 and Midhat in 1935. She died in Baku in 1955. There is a museum of her life and works in Kahrizli.

See also
Cotton production in Azerbaijan

References 

                   

1873 births
1955 deaths
Azerbaijani feminists
Proponents of Islamic feminism
Azerbaijani philanthropists
Azerbaijani educators
Azerbaijani Shia Muslims
Azerbaijani nobility
Azerbaijani expatriates in Iran
Soviet expatriates in Iran
Azerbaijani women writers
Azerbaijani writers
Azerbaijani publicists
Translators from Russian
Azerbaijani humanitarians